The women's lightweight (56 kg/123.2 lbs) Low-Kick category at the W.A.K.O. World Championships 2007 in Belgrade was the second-lightest of the female Low-Kick tournaments, involving nine fighters all based in Europe.  Each of the matches was three rounds of two minutes each and were fought under Low-Kick rules.  

As there were too few fighters for a sixteen-person tournament, seven women had a bye through to the quarter finals.  Serbia's Milena Dincic beat Russia's Lidia Andreeva by unanimous decision in the gold medal match.  Pole Alicja Piecyk and Swede Elisa Albinsson took the bronze medal positions.

Results

Key

See also
List of WAKO Amateur World Championships
List of WAKO Amateur European Championships
List of female kickboxers

References

External links
 WAKO World Association of Kickboxing Organizations Official Site

Kickboxing events at the WAKO World Championships 2007 Belgrade
2007 in kickboxing
Kickboxing in Serbia